Talabkhoja Sattorov (Tajik: Талабхӯҷа Сатторов) (1953 – April 10, 2007) was Tajik composer. He was the chairman of Union of Composers of Tajikistan and the chairman of the Tajikistan National Conservatory.

Compositions
He was an author of "Ghazal" (vocal music), "The music of Happiness", "For Holiday" (symphony description), Tarannum of Norooz (concert scene), "The Voice of Women" (oratory-ballet), "Rustam and Suhrob" (opera), a number of two string quartets, rhapsody for two royals and one orchestration. He also composed more than a hundred national musics.

1953 births
2007 deaths
Tajik musicians
Tajikistani composers